is a railway station in the city of  Shinshiro, Aichi Prefecture, Japan, operated by Central Japan Railway Company (JR Tōkai).

Lines
Higashi-Shimmachi Station is served by the Iida Line, and is located 22.6 kilometers from the starting point of the line at Toyohashi Station.

Station layout
The station has a single side platform serving one bi-directional track.The station building has automated ticket machines, TOICA automated turnstiles and is unattended.

Adjacent stations

|-
!colspan=5|Central Japan Railway Company

Station history
Higashi-Shimmachi Station was established on January 1, 1914, as a station on the now-defunct . On August 1, 1943, t the Toyokawa Railway were nationalized along with some other local lines to form the Japanese Government Railways (JGR) Iida Line.  Scheduled freight operations were discontinued in 1971. Along with its division and privatization of JNR on April 1, 1987, the station came under the control and operation of the Central Japan Railway Company. A new station building was completed in December 2006.

Surrounding area
 Shinshiro High School

See also
 List of Railway Stations in Japan

References

External links

Railway stations in Japan opened in 1914
Railway stations in Aichi Prefecture
Iida Line
Stations of Central Japan Railway Company
Shinshiro, Aichi